Marykate O'Neil (born 1968) is an American indiepop singer-songwriter, currently based in New York City. She is known for her quirky, literate pop sensibilities. She released her fourth solo effort, Underground (Nettwerk/71 Recordings), on February 3, 2009, following 2002's self-titled album (which made it onto CMJ's 'Best of 2002' list), 2006’s 1-800-Bankrupt, and 2008’s mkULTRA EP. Her work has previously been hailed by critics as "witty, angsty goodness", and "pure magic".

Biography
While attending Boston University, O'Neil ended up singing and playing guitar in the indie-pop outfit piewackit. Though the band had a deal with I.R.S. Records and was pulling off shows with Ida, Mary Lou Lord, Juliana Hatfield, Lois, and Elliott Smith, things fell apart, and O'Neil moved to New York City.

In 2002, she recorded her self-titled debut album, financing the project with pre-approved credit cards. The record caught on among fans of literate pop, and reached the top 10 of the CMJ charts. Three songs from Marykate O'Neil were covered by Japanese film and television star Tomoyo Harada. The Nettwerk music group picked up 1-800-Bankrupt and re-released the album, broadening O'Neil's exposure. In 2006 O'Neil's song "Mundane Dream" was featured in the Sundance award-winning film Stephanie Daley starring Tilda Swinton, Amber Tamblyn, and Timothy Hutton.

Along the way, O'Neil has befriended like-minded musicians and writers forming a community of players who reappear on all of her records and are her own 'wrecking crew' of sorts. Members include Matthew Caws (Nada Surf), Lianne Smith, Ken Maiuri (Pedro the Lion, The Soft Drugs), Brad Jones (Josh Rouse, David Mead), Roger Moutenot (Yo La Tengo, Sleater Kinney) and Jill Sobule. Jill Sobule has also co-written a number of songs as well as produced O'Neil's records. O'Neil and Sobule met in the 90's when O'Neil was a member of piewackit playing at a festival in LA with Jill Sobule, Frente!, and The Murmurs. O'Neil is also known for her DIY ethic and typically records song tracks in her home, as well as doing her own album artwork.

Discography

piewackit
sockmonkee (1997, Rock-It Records), produced by Michael Deming (Lilys, Apples in Stereo, The Pernice Brothers)
"boyfriend" 7" single (1997, Aargh Records)
"prime time" 7" single (1997, Aargh Records)
featured on Somewhere Between Heaven and Xanax compilation on Pop Narcotic

Solo
Marykate O'Neil (2002, 71 Recordings), produced by Michael Deming & Jill Sobule
1-800-Bankrupt (2006, 71 Recordings), produced by Roger Moutenot & Jill Sobule
mkULTRA (EP) (2008, Nettwerk/71 Recordings), produced by Marykate O'Neil, Roger Moutenot & Jill Sobule
Underground (2009, Nettwerk/71 Recordings), produced by Marykate O'Neil, Jacob Lawson, Roger Moutenot, & Jill Sobule

Compilations
International Pop Overthrow - Vol. 4, "Mundane Dream" (2001, Not Lame Records)
Right to Chews: Bubblegum Classics Revisited, "Get Down" (2002, Not Lame Records)
International Pop Overthrow - Vol. 5, "Still Waiting" (2002, Not Lame Records)
What a Concept!: Tribute to Teenage Fanclub, "Traffic Jam" (2004, Not Lame Records)

Music videos
"Nashville" , off Underground, directed by Michael K. Anderson
"I Sleep With My Clothes On" , off 1-800-Bankrupt, directed by Marianne Petit
"Past All The Stars" , off 1-800-Bankrupt, directed by Marianne Petit. This video was featured in a 2006 IFC short film series. 
"The Sky Is Falling" , off 1-800-Bankrupt, directed by Marianne Petit
"Secret War" live from the Living Room in NYC, April 12, 2007 
"Green Street" live from World Cafe Live in Philadelphia, October 9, 2008, by Frantone

Selected press
Artist spotlight & interview from NewBeats, 2002 
Review of Marykate O'Neil from Splendid E-Zine, Jul. 23, 2002 
Review of 1-800-Bankrupt from Filter Magazine, May 2, 2006 
"My Favorite Things" feature article on PopMatters, Jun. 7, 2006 
Feature in Worcester Telegram, Jul. 7, 2007 
Single review of 'Green Street' (off Underground) in the Boston Globe, Oct. 7, 2008 
Interview feature in the Cambridge Chronicle, Oct. 10, 2008 
"Under the Radar" feature on Metromix, Dec. 19, 2008 
Underground included in Most Anticipated Albums of '09 from Blurt, Jan. 02, 2009 
Review of Underground from Allmusic []
Review of Underground from Sentimentalist Magazine, Feb. 3, 2009 
Feature in the Hudson Sun, Feb. 4, 2009

References

External links
Artist's Website
Marykate O'Neil on Myspace

American women singer-songwriters
1968 births
Living people
People from Hudson, Massachusetts
Singer-songwriters from Massachusetts